Syarhey Kantsavy (born 21 June 1986) is a Belarusian professional football coach and former player.

His older brother Artem Kontsevoy is also a former professional footballer.

Honours
Dinamo Minsk
Belarusian Premier League champion: 2004

Gomel
Belarusian Cup winner: 2010–11

External links
 
 

1986 births
Living people
Belarusian footballers
Association football defenders
Belarusian expatriate footballers
Expatriate footballers in Kazakhstan
Expatriate footballers in Uzbekistan
FC RUOR Minsk players
FC Dinamo Minsk players
FC Savit Mogilev players
FC Torpedo-BelAZ Zhodino players
FC Gomel players
FC Tobol players
FC Belshina Bobruisk players
FK Neftchi Farg'ona players
FC Isloch Minsk Raion players
FC Minsk players
FC Naftan Novopolotsk players
FC Arsenal Dzerzhinsk players